Puck  (formerly ) is a town in northern Poland with 11,350 inhabitants. It is in Gdańsk Pomerania on the south coast of the Baltic Sea (Bay of Puck) and part of Kashubia with many Kashubian speakers in the town. Previously in the Gdańsk Voivodeship (1975–1998), Puck has been the capital of Puck County in the Pomeranian Voivodeship since 1999.

History

The settlement became a marketplace and a seaport as early as the 7th century. The name, as was common during the Middle Ages, was spelled differently: in a 1277 document Putzc, 1277 Pusecz, 1288 Puczse and Putsk, 1289 Pucz. It was part of Poland, and in 1309, it was annexed by the Teutonic Order. Puck achieved town status in 1348. The town's first hospital was founded in the 14th century. In the late 14th or the early 15th century, a castle was built.

In 1440, the town joined the Prussian Confederation, which opposed Teutonic rule, and upon the request of which King Casimir IV Jagiellon re-incorporated the territory to the Kingdom of Poland in 1454. The Teutonic Knights renounced any claims in a 1466 peace treaty. It was the seat of local County Administration (Starostwo) within the Pomeranian Voivodeship in the province of Royal Prussia in the Greater Poland Province. The starosts resided in the castle, which was later expanded and also housed the arsenal.

The Polish kings tried to create a fleet at Danzig (Gdańsk), but the autonomous Hanseatic Danzig would not allow them in their territory. Ships chartered by Poland had to land at Puck in 1567. Poland tried to establish the Polish Navy and gained the use some harbors in Livonia and Finland, but a standing navy never materialized. King Sigismund III Vasa also tried to establish a fleet in his attempts to wrest the crown of Sweden from King Gustavus Adolphus of Sweden, but it was destroyed in 1628. In 1655–1656, Puck was successfully defended during a Swedish siege in time of the Swedish invasion of Poland. The town, including the castle, was spared from serious damage, but the hospital was destroyed. Polish King John III Sobieski funded the construction of a new hospital, completed in 1681.

In 1772, in the First Partition of Poland, the town was annexed by the Kingdom of Prussia, and in 1773, it became part of the newly established province of West Prussia. The Prussian administration dismantled the castle and the remains of the medieval town walls. The town, as Putzig, became part of Germany in 1871. In 1913, it became the garrison of the first planes of the Imperial German Navy. After World War I, Poland regained independence and Puck was ceded to the Second Polish Republic in accordance with the Treaty of Versailles. In 1920, Poland celebrated Poland's Wedding to the Sea in Puck. The first actual Polish Navy was founded at the end of World War I in 1918 with some French and British involvement. Puck, the only Polish harbor until Gdynia was built in the 1920s, served as the main harbor of the Polish Navy until World War II.

World War II

Puck was bombed by Nazi Germany at 5.20 a.m. Polish time on Friday September 1, known thereafter as Grey Friday, the first day of the invasion of Poland, which started World War II. Luftwaffe bombers dropped a projectile on the town, which also had an airbase for the Naval Air Squadron and dealt significant damage to the Polish air force units stationed there.

During the subsequent German occupation of Poland, many Poles from the region, including officials, merchants, directors, teachers, judges, priests, notaries, railwaymen, pharmacists, blacksmiths, technicians, postmen and farmers, were imprisoned in Puck and afterwards murdered in the Piaśnica massacre as part of the Intelligenzaktion. In November 1939, the SS expelled Polish families, which were either murdered in the massacres or deported to Nazi concentration camps. Polish students from local high schools were also massacred in Piaśnica.

In the building of the local brewery in 1940, the Germans created a transit camp in which the racial selection of the expelled Polish inhabitants of the region was carried out. Those considered to be "racially valuable" were deported to Germanisation camps and labor camps in Germany, and the rest were expelled to the General Government. Poles expelled from Gmina Dziemiany were used as forced labour in the local factory. The Germans operated a branch of the Stutthof concentration camp in Puck from 1941 to 1944. In 1945, after the war, Puck was restored to Poland.

Interesting places

Gothic St Peter and Paul's church (13th century)
Town Hall (1865)
Burghers' houses at the old market square, 17th century, rebuilt in the 19th century
Flooded port (8th-10th century) located some 500 metres from the shore
Remnants of a brick castle (14th century)
Memorials of gen. Józef Haller and Poland's Wedding to the Sea
Puck region museum (Muzeum Ziemi Puckiej)
Former 17th-century hospital, now housing an ethnographic museum
Wooden pier
Marina
Caves in Mechowo
Coastal Landscape Park (Nadmorski Park Krajobrazowy)

Population

Land use

Sports
The local football team is Zatoka 95 Puck. It competes in the lower leagues.

Notable residents
 Charles VIII of Sweden (1408-1470), lived in the town as a refugee in the 1460s.
 Heinrich Joseph Horwitz (1824–1899), German liberal politician
 Heinrich Edwin Rickert (1833–1902), German journalist and liberal politician
 Stanisław Jaskułka (born 1958) a retired Polish long jumper, came fifth with 8.13 metres at the 1980 Summer Olympics 
 Daniel Pliński (born 1978) a former Polish volleyball player, a member of Poland men's national volleyball team fromn 2005 to 2010, competed in the 2008 Summer Olympics
 Sławek Jaskułke (born 1979), pianist, composer and arranger
 Marcin Wika (born 1983) a Polish volleyball player, a member of Poland men's national volleyball team from 2008 to 2009, competed in the 2008 Summer Olympics
 Jakub Biskup (born 1983) a Polish footballer, over 250 pro games
 Adam Łapeta (born 1987) a Polish professional basketball player

International relations

Puck, Poland is twinned with:

See also
 Hel
 Jastarnia
 Amber Road

References

External links

Puck on-line
Puck region museum (Muzeum Ziemi Puckiej)
Seaside Landscape Park (Nadmorski Park Krajobrazowy)
Statistics on Puck - Central Statistical Office (en)
Map of the town
Puck on the map of Poland
HOM Puck – Scout Sailing Centre in Puck (pl)
Stare fotografie miasta Puck
Puck ® 2013

Puck
Coastal cities and towns in Poland
Puck
Pomeranian Voivodeship (1919–1939)
Seaside resorts in Poland